"Beg, Steal or Borrow" was the  entry in the  Eurovision Song Contest 1972, performed in English by The New Seekers.

The song was composed and written by Tony Cole, Steve Wolfe and Graeme Hall. It is a love song to a former lover claiming the two should be together and the singer will "beg, steal or borrow" in order to "bring" the other love.

On the night of the contest, the song  was performed fifth, directed by David Mackay. It followed 's Jaime Morey with "Amanece" and preceded 's Grethe Kausland and Benny Borg with "Småting". At the close of voting, it had received 114 points, placing 2nd in a field of 18.

Charts

References

External links 
This article was based in information in Diggilloo Thrush: from Diggiloo Thrush retrieved on May 25, 2009 

Eurovision songs of 1972
1972 singles
Polydor Records singles
1972 songs
Eurovision songs of the United Kingdom
Songs written by Steve Wolfe
The New Seekers songs
Songs written by Tony Cole (musician)